The Svenska Flygfabriken LN-3 Seagull is a two-seater single-engine pusher configuration amphibian kitplane made from composite material, powered by a D-Motor LF26, D-Motor LF39 or Rotax 912/914 engine. It is fitted with retracting conventional landing gear. The manufacturer is Svenska Flygfabriken AB, based in Sundsvall, Sweden. Work started on building the prototype in 2003, and the maiden flight was made on 5 February 2008 at Midlanda Airport.
Take-offs and landings on land, ice and water have all been tested during the test program..

The designer of this aircraft is Lage Norberg, who has been working on the design since the early 1980s. It is intended to match the regulatory standards for amphibian homebuilt aircraft in the Ultralight, Microlight and Light Sport Aircraft Categories, as well as the FAR 23 Aerobatic category.

Specifications (LN-3 Seagull)

See also
 Republic RC-3 Seabee

References

External links
 Flygfabriken Homepage
 List of experimental aircraft (Swedish).

Seagull
Single-engined pusher aircraft
High-wing aircraft
2000s Swedish sport aircraft
Light-sport aircraft
Flying boats
Amphibious aircraft
Aircraft first flown in 2008